The Wiriagar or Aimau River is a river in southern West Papua province, Indonesia.

Geography
The river flows in the southern area of West Papua with predominantly tropical rainforest climate (designated as Af in the Köppen-Geiger climate classification). The annual average temperature in the area is 24 °C. The warmest month is January, when the average temperature is around 26 °C, and the coldest is February, at 22 °C. The average annual rainfall is 3744 mm. The wettest month is June, with an average of 484 mm rainfall, and the driest is October, with 153 mm rainfall.

See also
List of rivers of Indonesia
List of rivers of Western New Guinea

References

Rivers of West Papua (province)
Rivers of Indonesia